Let's Stay Together is an American romantic comedy television series created by Jacque Edmonds Cofer. It premiered on BET on January 11, 2011. The series premiere drew 4.4 million viewers. Initially, Soul Food star Malinda Williams was cast in the lead role of Stacy. For undisclosed reasons, she was recast with Nadine Ellis. On April 20, 2011, BET announced that the series was renewed for a second season which aired 22 episodes starting in January 2012. For its second season, Erica Hubbard appeared infrequently due to her pregnancy. New cast member Kyla Pratt (formerly of UPN's One on One) joined the cast portraying Crystal, Charles and Kita's cousin. At the 2012 BET Upfront on April 13, 2012, it was revealed that the show has been renewed for a third season. The third season premiered on March 26, 2013. In April 2013, BET Networks announced the show had been renewed for a fourth season which premiered on March 4, 2014.

Series overview

Episodes

Season 1 (2011)

Season 2 (2012)

Season 3 (2013)

Season 4 (2014)

References

External links

Lists of American sitcom episodes